Maximilien Joseph Hurtault (8 June 1765, Huningue - 2 May 1824, Paris) was a French architect.

Biography
His earliest work was with the Director of fortifications in Huningue. After his arrival in Paris, he became a student of Richard Mique, and was employed by him for work at the Petit Trianon. 

Under the Directorate, he served as a professor at the École Polytechnique. Later, he became an architectural inspector for the Conseil des Anciens, and the Conseil des Cinq-Cents at the Palais Bourbon. He also participated in the restoration of the Palais des Tuileries; notably, the decorations for the chapel and the theatre, under the direction of Charles Percier and Pierre-François-Léonard Fontaine.

After obtaining a grand prize for architecture, he spent almost two years in Italy. Upon returning, he was appointed an official architect at the Château de Fontainebleau, where he performed several restorations; notably on the pavilion at the pond, and the long hallway known as the Galerie de Diane. He also designed the "English Garden".

He was a member of the jury at the École Nationale Supérieure des Beaux-Arts, and was entrusted with the general inspection of civic buildings. In 1819, he was admitted to the Institut de France, and took Seat #1 for architecture, succeeding Jacques Gondouin. The following year, he became Director of Works for Saint-Cloud. Shortly after, Louis XVIII commissioned him to create a garden there, for Louise d'Artois and her newborn brother, Henri, duc de Bordeaux. After his death, the project was completed by Eugène Dubreuil (1782-1862). 

He was interred in the 11th Division at the Cimetière du Père-Lachaise.

References

Further reading 
 
 
 
 Elisabeth Buchi, "Maximilien Joseph Hurtault", in Nouveau dictionnaire de biographie alsacienne, vol. 18, p. 1724

External links 

1765 births
1824 deaths
French architects
French landscape architects
Burials at Père Lachaise Cemetery
People from Haut-Rhin
Members of the Académie des beaux-arts